The 1979 Australian Sports Car Championship was a CAMS sanctioned motor racing title for drivers of Group D Production Sports Cars. It was the eleventh Australian Sports Car Championship and the fourth to be restricted to cars complying with Group D regulations.

The championship was won by Ross Mathieson driving a Porsche Carrera.

Schedule
The championship was contested over four rounds.

Class structure
Cars competed in two engine capacity classes:
 Up to and including 2000cc
 Over 2000cc

Points system
Championship points were awarded on a 9-6-4-3-2-1 basis for the first six places in each class at each round and on a 4-3-2-1 basis for the first four outright places at each round.

For Round 1, the round results, on which championship points were awarded, were determined by allocating race points on a 20-16-13-11-10-9-8-9-7-6-5-4-3-2-1 for the first 14 outright places in each race and aggregating the points for each driver. Where more than one driver attained the same total, the superior round position was awarded to the higher placed driver in the second race.

Results

References

External links
 Christopher de Fraga, Last Dash Win for Mathieson, The Age, 28 May 1979, news.google.com
 Image of Ross Mathieson and John Gourlay at Winton in 1979, www.motorsportarchive.com

Australian Sports Car Championship
Sports Car Championship